= Frühstück =

Polish rock band

- Origin: Wrocław, Poland
- Genres: rock
- Years active: 1997–present
- Labels: Youngside
- Members: Martijn Krale; Wojtek Karel (Łoś); Tomek Kuźbik (Scottie); Marcin Karel (Szczypior)
- Website: facebook.com/fruhstuckpl

Frühstück is a Polish rock band from Wrocław, Poland. The band started making music in 1997, and their frontman is Martijn Krale. Their first studio album, Quiet, was released in 2012 by Youngside Records.

== Background ==
Frühstück is of the hard rock variety, from Wrocław, Poland. Their members are lead vocalist, Martijn Krale, guitarist, Marcin Karel (Szczypior), bassist, Wojtek Karel (Łoś), and drummer, Tomek Kuźbik (Scottie).

== Music history ==
The band commenced as a musical entity in 1997, with their major studio album release, Quiet, that was released by Youngside Records on 3 March 2012.

== Members ==
Current members

- Martijn Krale - vocal
- Wojtek Karel (Łoś) - bass
- Tomek Kuźbik (Scottie) - drums
- Marcin Karel (Szczypior) - guitars

== Discography ==
Studio albums

- Mine (2000)
- Muza (2003)
- Quiet (2012, Youngside)
- Story (2014)
- Brother (2015)
